The 500 metres distance for women in the 2008–09 ISU Speed Skating World Cup was contested over 13 races on seven occasions, out of a total of nine World Cup occasions for the season, with the first occasion taking place in Berlin, Germany, on 7–9 November 2008, and the final occasion taking place in Salt Lake City, United States, on 6–7 March 2009.

Jenny Wolf of Germany successfully defended her title, while Margot Boer of the Netherlands came second. Lee Sang-hwa of South Korea repeated her third place from the previous season.

Top three

Race medallists

Final standings
Standings as of 8 March 2009 (end of the season).

References

Women 0500
ISU